Sophronia acaudella is a moth of the family Gelechiidae. It was described by Rebel in 1903. It is found in Bulgaria.

The wingspan is about 13 mm. Adults are very similar to Sophronia chilonella.

References

Moths described in 1903
Sophronia (moth)